Night Dubbing is the third album by British soul/dance group Imagination, produced by Steve Jolley and Tony Swain and released in 1983.  The album consists of dub remixes of tracks from Imagination's first two albums, Body Talk and In the Heat of the Night, and reached No 9 on the UK Albums chart.

All tracks from this album are available on the United Kingdom 2CD compilation set Just an Illusion: The Very Best of Imagination.

Reception
Andy Kellman of Allmusic rated the album 3.5 out of 5 stars and said: "Though it hits more often than it misses, Night Dubbing is of value to DJs and completists only."

Track listing

Personnel 
Technical

 Steve Jolley – producer, arrangement, remix (all except 7)
 Tony Swain – producer, arrangement, remix (all except 7)
 Richard Lengyel – remix (all except 7)
 Larry Levan – remix (7)
 Tony Bridge – mastering
 Diane Waller – cover design, production and direction
 Tim Gates – cover design, production and direction
 Phil Surbey – photography
 All tracks remixed at Red Bus Studios, London, except "Changes", remixed at Electric Lady Studios, New York

References

Imagination (band) albums
Albums produced by Jolley & Swain
1983 remix albums
RCA Records remix albums